The Lunjina Serbian–Aromanian Association (/ ,  / ) is an organization of Aromanians in Serbia with its headquarters at Belgrade, the capital of the country. It was founded in 1991 as a result of the merge of two Aromanian organizations at Dolna Belica and Gorna Belica, which are two Aromanian villages in North Macedonia. The aim of the organization is to protect the Aromanian minority in Serbia and preserve its customs, culture, language, name and traditions. In 2017, the Lunjina Serbian–Aromanian Association had around 500 members. The president of the organization is Aristotel Martinović. In Aromanian, the word  means "light".

Most members of the Lunjina Serbian–Aromanian Association are recent ethnic Aromanian immigrants from North Macedonia, with only a small part of them being descendants of the Aromanian community that has lived in Serbia for centuries. The organization has published several books on Aromanian grammar and a CD of traditional Aromanian music and publishes the journal Light. Bulletin of the Serbian–Aromanian Association. It has also been proposed that the Lunjina Serbian–Aromanian Association organize optional courses in Aromanian at the University of Belgrade Faculty of Philology.

Members of the Lunjina Serbian–Aromanian Association are among the few Aromanians in Serbia who continue to actively practice and use their language and culture. In fact, between 2014 and 2017, this organization offered weekly Aromanian-language courses, but these were discontinued due to a lack of students and were replaced by Anveatsã armaneashti! (Learn Aromanian!), an online platform to learn Aromanian created in Romania.

The Lunjina Serbian–Aromanian Association has strived for the recognition of the Aromanians as a national minority in Serbia, but this has been rejected as far since they did not meet the minimum number of people that a community must have to be granted this status, which is 300, in the last Serbian census. The Aromanians in Serbia number between 5,000 to 15,000 people, but only 243 people declared themselves ethnic "Tsintsar" (i.e. Aromanian, "Tsintsar" being the name Serbs use for the Aromanians) in the latest census.

See also
 Aromanians in Serbia

References

External links
  (now defunct)

Aromanians in Serbia
Aromanian cultural organizations
1991 establishments in Serbia
Organizations established in 1991
Organizations based in Belgrade